Flying Towards the New Horizon is the second full-length album by Beto Vázquez Infinity, released 24 October 2006.

Track listing
 "Cardassia and Bajor" (Beto Vázquez/Lucas Pereyra) – 1:30
 "After the Tempest" (Beto Vázquez/Lucas Pereyra) – 6:37
 "Lord of the Sky (remake)" (Beto Vázquez/Danilo Moschén/Gonzalo Iglesias) – 5:21
 "The Tunnel of the Souls" (Beto Vázquez/Carlos Ferrari) – 4:23
 "Time of Reflection" (Beto Vázquez/Lucas Pereyra/Ramiro Escobar) – 4:56
 "Soldiers of Hope (remake)" (Beto Vázquez) – 5:45
 "Star Losers" (Beto Vázquez) – 4:20
 "Secret" (Beto Vázquez) – 5:36
 "She is my Guide" (Beto Vázquez/Lucas Pereyra) – 3:07
 "Sunrise" (Beto Vázquez/Victor Rivarola) – 1:59
 "Dreaming in Clouds" (Beto Vázquez) – 4:22
 "Tale of the Black Tower" (Beto Vázquez) – 7:50

All lyrics written by Beto Vázquez except "Dreaming in Clouds", by Antti Railio

Credits

Beto Vázquez Infinity
Vero Aiudi: Lead and backing Vocals
Lead vocals tracks: 1,2,3,6,12. Backing vocals tracks: 2,3,5,6,7,11,12.
Victor Rivarola: Lead and backing Vocals – Keyboards – Acoustic Guitars
Keyboards tracks: 3,6,9. Lead vocals tracks: 2,7,12. 
Backing vocals tracks: 2,3,7,11. All acoustic guitars on track 10.
Gerardo Elsegood: Lead & Rhythm Guitars
Lead guitar tracks:2,3,6,7,12, rhythm guitars tracks 3,6,7,9,12. Acoustic guitars on track 6.
Norberto Roman: Drums & Percussion.
Beto Vázquez: Bass – Keyboards – Programming
Keyboards tracks: 4,7,8,10,11,12. Programming tracks: 8,10,12. Acoustic bass track 10, backing vocals track 7.

Guests
Antti Railio (Celesty): Lead & backing vocals track 11.
Sonia Pineault (Forgotten Tales): Lead & backing vocals track 8.
Aldo Lonobile (Secret Sphere): Lead guitar solo 1&2 track 5.
Quinn Weng (Seraphim): Lead & backing vocals track 9.
Nahor Andrade (Dynasty): Lead & backing vocals track 5.

Guest musicians from Argentina
J.P. Kilberg (Magika): lead & rhythm guitars track 11.
Diego Valdez (Eidyllion): lead vocals track 5, chorus track 11&12.
Pato Larralde (Sauron): chorus tracks 7, lead vocal track 12.
Adrian Subotovsky: lead guitar solo 2 track 2.
Carlos Ferrari (LHermite): acoustic guitar tracks 8&12, rhythm guitars tracks 4,5,8,12, lead guitars tracks 4&8.
Lucas Pereyra: rhythm guitar track 2, piano solo track 7, programming tracks 1,2,5,7,9.
Pablo Soler: lead guitar solo 3 track 5.
Sebastian Cast: Forewords & lead vocals track 12.
Ramiro Escobar: keyboards track 5.
Rocio Vilela: chorus tracks 5,6,11, lead vocals track 12.
Julian uJuarez: chorus track 12.
Karina Varela: (Dominus Inferi): chorus track 12.
Nora Vazquez: chorus track 7.
Estefania Encina: chorus track 7
Sony Bonini: chorus track 7 – Dialogue intro track 8 Vero Aiudi & Ximena Udrizar.

External links
 Official Website 

2006 albums
Beto Vázquez Infinity albums